Nathanael Ananias da Silva (born 6 May 1997), known as Nathan Silva or simply Nathan, is a Brazilian footballer who plays for Atlético Mineiro. Mainly a central defender, he can also play as a defensive midfielder.

Club career
Born in Oliveira, Minas Gerais, Nathan joined Atlético Mineiro's youth setup in 2011, aged 13. After taking part of the 2017 Florida Cup with the main squad, he made his professional debut on 9 April 2017 by coming on as a first-half substitute for Jesiel in a 1–2 Campeonato Mineiro away loss against Caldense.

On 20 February 2018, Nathan extended his contract until the end of 2021 and was loaned to Ponte Preta, initially until the end of the year. He then became a regular starter for the side, and scored his first goal on 8 August by netting the opener in a 4–0 away routing of Paysandu.

On 26 June 2019, after falling down the pecking order, Nathan cut short his loan deal, and joined Atlético Goianiense also in a temporary deal on 4 July. On 15 January 2020, after helping Dragão to achieve promotion to the Série A, he signed for Coritiba, also newly promoted, on loan for one year.

On 27 February 2021, Nathan rejoined Atlético Goianiense on another year-long loan. His performances prompted Atlético Mineiro manager Cuca to request his recall on 2 July. Back at his parent club, Nathan immediately established himself in the starting lineup, forming with Junior Alonso the defensive duo of the 2021 Campeonato Brasileiro Série A winning team.

Personal life
Nathan's older brother Werley is also a footballer and a centre back. He too was groomed at Atlético.

Career statistics

Honours
Atlético Mineiro
Campeonato Brasileiro Série A: 2021
Supercopa do Brasil: 2022
Campeonato Mineiro: 2017, 2022

References

External links

1997 births
Living people
Sportspeople from Minas Gerais
Brazilian footballers
Association football defenders
Association football midfielders
Campeonato Brasileiro Série A players
Campeonato Brasileiro Série B players
Clube Atlético Mineiro players
Associação Atlética Ponte Preta players
Atlético Clube Goianiense players
Coritiba Foot Ball Club players